Vĩnh Phúc is a province in the Red River Delta of northern Vietnam.

Administrative divisions
Vĩnh Phúc is subdivided into 8 district-level sub-divisions:
 7 districts:

 Sông Lô
 Bình Xuyên
 Lập Thạch
 Tam Đảo
 Tam Dương
 Vĩnh Tường
 Yên Lạc

 2 provincial city:
 Vĩnh Yên (capital)
 Phúc Yên

They are further subdivided into 12 commune-level towns (or townlets), 112 communes, and 13 wards.

Events

Closure of Sơn Lôi Commune during the COVID-19 pandemic

On February 13, 2020, Vĩnh Phúc province has decided to lock down Sơn Lôi Commune - a rural community of over 10,600 in Bình Xuyên District - for fourteen days as an effort to contain the disease caused by the Severe acute respiratory syndrome coronavirus 2 (SARS-CoV 2) virus. Seven of the total of sixteen people contracted the virus in Vietnam are residents of Sơn Lôi Commune - including a three-month-old girl. Authorities have established mobile shops and provided food and face masks to the community.

References

External links
Official site of Vĩnh Phúc Government

 
Provinces of Vietnam